Cody Cooke (born 2 March 1993) is an English professional footballer who plays as a striker for Bath City.

Early and personal life
Born in Truro, Cooke attended Penryn College.

Career
Cooke began his career in English non-league football with Penryn Athletic, before playing for Truro City between 2011 and 2018, while studying for a PGCE in Sport Development at Plymouth Marjon University.

After spending time with the V9 Academy, Cooke turned professional in June 2018, after signing for Scottish club St Mirren alongside Josh Heaton. He made his debut for St Mirren on 13 July 2018 in the Scottish League Cup. He scored a hat-trick in the final game of the 2018–19 season. He described his first season as a professional as a "rollercoaster".

On 1 August 2019, the club confirmed that Cooke would be out of action for between six and nine months after rupturing knee ligaments during a match. He returned to action in December 2019.

On 2 June 2020 it was announced that he would remain with the club under the coronavirus furlough scheme before leaving the club. In June 2020, Cooke left Saints when his contract expired. Cooke said he wanted to move nearer to his home in Cornwall, and would consider returning to part-time football in order to do so.

On 28 August 2020, Cooke signed for newly-promoted National League side Weymouth. 

Cooke was released from Weymouth at the end of the 2020–21 season, and on 11 June 2021 joined National League South side Bath City.

Career statistics

References

1993 births
Living people
English footballers
Penryn Athletic F.C. players
Truro City F.C. players
V9 Academy players
St Mirren F.C. players
Weymouth F.C. players
Bath City F.C. players
National League (English football) players
Southern Football League players
Scottish Professional Football League players
Association football forwards
Footballers from Cornwall